Al-Kindi Ensemble is a Sufi musical group founded in 1983 by Julien Jalâl Eddine Weiss. Based in Aleppo, Syria, Al Kindi Ensemble is mostly known for its works on the Arab-Muslim and Sufi musical traditions.

History
Founded in 1983 in Aleppo by Julien Weiss as a tribute to Al-Kindi, a philosopher and music theorist of Arab world, Al Kindi Ensemble began its journey with the spirit to explore Arab-Andalusian, Oriental, Turkish and Iranian influences in music. The ensemble wanted to acquire a repertoire from the entire Arab world. At the beginning the group consisted of only three instrumentalists. The Egyptian Tar and Riqq player Adel Schams Eldin, Julien Weiss and the Syrian Nay player Ziad Kadhi Amin. Initially, the ensemble only played instrumental pieces. Julien Weiss later decided to expand the group. He traveled to Syria and met with Sheikh Hamza Shakkûr, a well-known singer of classical music. Shakkûr was also the head of the Sufi community of the whirling dervishes. In 1986, Weiss converted to Islam and settled in Aleppo. There he developed a collaboration between him and many singers of classical music from Iraq and Syria, such as Adib Dayikh and the Tunisian singer and musician Lotfi Bouchnak.

Musical style
Accompanied by loud and longer devotional chanting, the group uses multiple instruments such as oud, spike fiddle, flute, percussion and zither to create a melodious symphony. The music is often accompanied by whirling dervishes during their concerts such as Sahin Nasir from Istanbul, Maher and Hatem Al Jamal from Damascus, and Yahyah Hamami and Yousef Shreymo from Aleppo.

Musicians

Instrumentists

 Julien Jalâl Eddine Weiss (died in 2015), qanûn player and director of the ensemble
 Adel Shams El Din , Egyptian master of the riqq
 Mohamed Saada (died in 2005), Tunisian flutist and musicologist from Nay
 Abd al Salam Safar (died 1999), master of Syrian taqsim and nay player
 Zyad Qadi-Amin, flutist from Damascus
 Mohamed Qadri Dalal, Syrian master of the Ud
 Mohamed Gomar, Iraqi master of the djoza
 Ozer Ozel, the lute master from Turkey
 Alem Kasimov, master of the Azerbaijani tar
 Mehmet Refik Kaya, Turkish master of the Sufi and Ottoman rabab
 Osman Oksuzoglu, Turkish master of Ottoman kudüm

Singers

The Al-Kindî Ensemble has welcomed many solo singers since 1990 including:

 Sheikh Hamza Shakkûr (died in 2008)
 Sabri Moudallal, composer of religious song from the great mosque of Aleppo
 Adîb Al-Dâyikh (died in 2000), ghazal reciter from Aleppo
 Sheikh Habboush, the leader of the zawiya qaderiya Sufi brotherhood from Aleppo
 Omar Sarmini, Syrian master of the qasidah
 Huseyn Ismail Al Azami, master of the classical Maqam from Baghdad
 Dogan Dikmen, Ottoman classical singer and professor at Yeldiz University and member of the TRT orchestra in Istanbul
 Bekir Buyukbas, hafiz and muezzin of the Sultan Fethi mosque in Istanbul
 Lotfi Bouchnak, malouf singer from Tunis
 Constantin Angelidis, from Athens, Greece

Discography

 (1988) Arab Classical Music, instrumental trio with Mohamed Saada
 (1993) Classical Songs from Tunisia and the Middle East, with Lotfi Bouchnak
 (1994) Syria: Takasim & Sufi Chants From Damaskus with Hamza Shakkûr
 (1995) The Passion of the Thousand and One Nights with Husayn Ismail Al-Azami
 (1995) Sufi Songs from Damascus with Hamza Shakkûr
 (1998) The Aleppian Music Room with Sabri Moudallal and Omar Sarmini
 (1999) The Whirling Dervishes of Damascus with Hamza Shakkûr
 (2001) The Crusades - Tribute to Prince Ousama Ibn al Mounqidh with Omar Sarmini
 (2003) Aleppian Sufi Transe with Sheikh Habboush
 (2006) Ottoman Perfumes with Dogan Dikmen and Omar Sarmini
 (2011) Arab Music From The Time Of The Crusaders with Omar Sarmini

References

Performers of Sufi music